Connor Sheehan (born 7 June 1987) is a Bahamian international soccer player, who most recently played in the Vancouver Metro Soccer League for Bombastic FC.

Playing career

Club
Sheehan started his career with the School soccer team of the Nassau based St. Andrew's School. He joined than in the summer of 2005 to UK based Crewe Alexandra F.C. After a half year left England and moved in the spring of 2006 to the United States. Now in the USA signed for Dallas Texans Soccer Club, which he won with the club, the 2006 competition of the Dallas Cup. After a half year with Dallas Texas, left his club for his studies and signed for the University of North Florida. He played here the 2006/2007 NCAA season with the UNF Ospreys men soccer team. Sheehan graduated 2009 and returned to the Bahamas to win the cup with Caledonia FC and played for the Paint Fair Silver Bullets, before joined in September 2012 in the Vancouver Metro Soccer League to Bombastic FC.

International 
He made his international debut for Bahamas in a March 2008 FIFA World Cup qualification match against the British Virgin Islands and has, as of March 2016, earned a total of 6 caps, scoring no goals. All of his 4 matches were in World Cup qualification.

References

External links

1987 births
Living people
Sportspeople from Nassau, Bahamas
Association football midfielders
Bahamian footballers
Bahamas international footballers
Crewe Alexandra F.C. players
University of North Florida alumni
Bahamian expatriate footballers
Expatriate footballers in England
Expatriate soccer players in the United States
Expatriate soccer players in Canada
Bahamian expatriate sportspeople in the United States
BFA Senior League players
Bahamian expatriate sportspeople in England
Bahamian expatriate sportspeople in Canada